Library Square may refer to:

Salt Lake City Public Library, with an outside plaza called Library Square, Utah, United States
Vancouver Library Square, a city block, including the central library branch, in downtown Vancouver, Canada